Marilyn Ann Darling  (née  Marilyn Skinner; born 7 November 1943) is an Australian philanthropist and patron of the arts. With her husband, Leonard Gordon Darling (known as Gordon Darling; 1921—2015), she instigated and has provided ongoing funding to the National Portrait Gallery in Canberra, ACT and other not-for-profit and charitable organisations.

Early life and education
Darling was born Marilyn Skinner in Brisbane, Queensland on 7 November 1943.

Career 
Following graduation, Darling worked as a microbiologist at the University of Melbourne from 1965 to 1968, and then as a postgraduate researcher at Monash University from 1973–1978. In 1979 she became president of the Victorian Children's Aid Society (VCAS) Auxiliary, then board member from 1984–1987.

From 1984 to 1989 Darling was a trustee of the Victorian State Opera Foundation and from 1986–1891 a member of the executive committee of the Dame Joan Hammond Award. She also spent three years on the organising committee for the Spoleto Festival in 1988–1991.

From 1985 to 1987 she was a member of the board of management of the Melbourne Lost Dogs Home. From 1987 to 1991 she was a member of the Music Foundation Appeal committee at the University of Melbourne's Trinity College.

In 1989 Darling became a member of the board of the Gordon Darling Australasian Print Fund at the National Gallery of Australia.

Darling was convenor patron of an exhibition, "Uncommon Australians: Towards an Australian Portrait Gallery", which travelled Australia from 1992 to 1993.

Honours and recognition
Darling was awarded the Centenary Medal on 1 January 2001 "for service to Australian society through the arts".

In the 2009 Australia Day Honours, Darling was made a Companion of the Order of Australia (AC) for "service to the development, advancement and growth of visual arts in Australia and internationally, particularly through the National Portrait Gallery, and to the community through a range of philanthropic endeavours".

Personal life
In October 1989 she married Leonard Gordon Darling (4 March 1921 — 31 August 2015), known as Gordon. There are two sons and two daughters of the marriage.

Harold Gordon Darling was Gordon's uncle, and one of his ancestors was test cricketer Joe Darling.

References 

Australian women philanthropists
Australian philanthropists
Philanthropists from Melbourne
Companions of the Order of Australia
Australian art patrons
Australian microbiologists
1943 births
Living people